Lee Collins (born 3 February 1974 in Bellshill, North Lanarkshire) is a Scottish former professional footballer.

Collins began his professional career in his native land with Albion Rovers. After two years, 45 league appearances, and one goal for the club, he moved south of the border to join English club Swindon Town. He remained at the County Ground for five years, making 64 appearances and scoring two goals. He won the Division Two championship with them in 1995–96.

In 2000, Steve McMahon, Collins' former manager at Swindon, signed him for Blackpool. Collins remained at Bloomfield Road for three years, making 66 appearances and scoring two goals. He won promotion via the Division Three play-offs in his first season with the club. In 2002 he started the final as Blackpool won the 2001–02 Football League Trophy.

In 2003, he was loaned to non-league Morecambe, and he went on to make the move permanent after negotiating a pay-off deal with Blackpool chairman Karl Oyston.

Collins returned to Scotland in 2004 with Stenhousemuir. He remained with the club for two years.

Honours
Swindon Town
 Division Two champions: 1995–96

Blackpool
 Division Three play-off winners: 2000–01
 Football League Trophy winner: 2001-02

References
Specific

General

1974 births
Living people
Footballers from Bellshill
Scottish footballers
Association football midfielders
Albion Rovers F.C. players
Swindon Town F.C. players
Blackpool F.C. players
Morecambe F.C. players
Stenhousemuir F.C. players
Scottish Football League players
English Football League players